Lycomorphodes coccipyga is a moth of the family Erebidae. It was described by Paul Dognin in 1909. It is found on Curaçao.

References

 Natural History Museum Lepidoptera generic names catalog

Cisthenina
Moths described in 1909